"Maggie's Farm" is a song written by Bob Dylan, recorded on January 15, 1965, and released on the album Bringing It All Back Home on March 22 of that year. Like many other Dylan songs of the 1965–66 period, "Maggie's Farm" is based on electric blues. It was released as a single in the United Kingdom on June 4, 1965, and peaked at No.22 on the chart. Dylan only needed one take to record the song, as may be heard on the exhaustive 18-disc Collector's Edition of The Bootleg Series Vol. 12: The Cutting Edge 1965–1966, which includes every alternate take recorded during Dylan's 1965–1966 sessions but only the one version of "Maggie's Farm".

Lyrics 
The lyrics of the song follow a straightforward blues structure, with the opening line of each verse ("I ain't gonna work...") sung twice, then repeated at the end of the verse. The third to fifth lines of each verse elaborate on and explain the sentiment expressed in the verse's opening/closing lines.

Critical response 
"Maggie's Farm" is described by Salon.com critic Bill Wyman as "a loping, laconic look at the service industry." Music critic Tim Riley described it as the "counterculture's war cry," but he also notes that the song has been interpreted as "a rock star's gripe to his record company, a songwriter's gripe to his publisher, and a singer-as-commodity's gripe to his audience-as-market." However, AllMusic's William Ruhlmann also notes that "in between the absurdities, the songwriter describes what sound like real problems. 'I got a head full of ideas/That are drivin' me insane,' he sings in the first verse, and given Dylan's prolific writing at the time, that's not hard to believe. In the last verse, he sings, 'I try my best/To be just like I am/But everybody wants you/To be just like them,' another comment that sounds sincere."

Newport Folk Festival 1965 
"Maggie's Farm" is well known for being at the center of the fervor that surrounded Dylan after his electric set at the 1965 Newport Folk Festival; it was that set's performance of "Maggie's Farm," much faster and more aggressive than on the Bringing It All Back Home recording and featuring prominent lead electric guitar by Mike Bloomfield, that caused the most controversy. The festival's production manager Joe Boyd claimed that "that first note of 'Maggie's Farm' was the loudest thing anybody had ever heard." It is still unknown what exactly was the biggest source of the controversy, with accounts of the event differing from individual to individual. Though Dylan's move from acoustic folk to electric rock had been extremely controversial, many accounts suggest the problem was largely due to poor sound. Pete Seeger, who is often cited as one of the main opponents to Dylan at Newport 1965, claimed in 2005:

Singer Eric Von Schmidt has a similar recollection of the event: "Whoever was controlling the mics messed it up. You couldn't hear Dylan. It looked like he was singing with the volume off."

Also, Al Kooper, Dylan's organist at the concert, claims:

However, the style of the music features heavily in several accounts such as that of Elektra Records founder Jac Holzman: "Backstage, Alan Lomax was bellowing that this was a folk festival, you just didn't have amplified instruments."

The "Maggie's Farm" performance from Newport was featured and discussed extensively in the 2005 Martin Scorsese documentary No Direction Home and released on its accompanying album, The Bootleg Series Vol. 7: No Direction Home: The Soundtrack. Media reviews of the soundtrack were overwhelmingly positive towards the "Maggie's Farm" performance, yielding such descriptions as "blistering" and "remarkably tight, and downright spine-tingling. You can sense Dylan and the band feeding off their collective nervous energy."  The Newport performance was also included in Murray Lerner's film The Other Side of the Mirror.

Cover versions 

"Maggie's Farm," like many Dylan songs, has been widely covered. One of the first versions was by Solomon Burke, "one of the first black singers to record a Bob Dylan song", who released it in 1965 just prior to Dylan's own single release, as the flip side of his "Tonight's the Night" (Atlantic 2288). Burke's version peaked at No.2 on the R&B charts, and No.28 on the Pop Charts.

In 1980, The Blues Band recorded a version as a commentary on then Prime Minister Margaret Thatcher's government. The line, "The National Guard stands around the door" being replaced with a line about the Special Patrol Group (SPG), the controversial unit of the London Metropolitan Police then being used to quell protests. The 2-Tone ska band The Specials also recorded a version, again relating to Margaret Thatcher, replacing the words "National Guard" with "National Front."

At various times the song has also been a live favorite of Uncle Tupelo (1988–89 tours), U2 (1986–87), The Specials, Richie Havens and Tin Machine, among others.  Recently there have been some reggae  versions including one by Toots Hibbert off of the Is It Rolling Bob? tribute album.
A much heavier version is Rage Against the Machine's interpretation appearing on their 2000 covers album, Renegades. In this version the line "She's 68 but she says she's 54"  has been changed to "She's 68 but she says she's 24". This is actually a change Dylan made for the electric version of "Maggie's Farm" he performed at the 1965 Newport Festival.  Rage Against the Machine's version of the song was featured during the end credits of the 2010 buddy cop film The Other Guys.

The song is performed by Stephen Malkmus and The Million Dollar Bashersa supergroup, which includes members of Sonic Youth and Televisionon the soundtrack of the 2007 Dylan biopic I'm Not There.

Muse often perform a variation of the main riff from the Rage Against the Machine cover of the song as an outro to "Map of the Problematique".

The Catalan band Mazoni performed a version of "Maggie's Farm" translated into the Catalan language, "La granja de la Paula", on their album Si els dits fossin xilòfons (Bankrobber, 2007). The translated lyrics follow the English version, but the name "Maggie" is changed to "Paula".

In 2006 Silvertide covered the song for the film Lady in the Water.

The song is covered by Hot Tuna on their 1992 Live at Sweetwater album.

Popular culture 
 The Beastie Boys' song "Johnny Ryall" contains the lyrics: "Washing windows on the Bowery at a quarter to four, 'Cause he ain't gonna' work on Maggie's farm no more."
 The OK Go song "The Greatest Song I Ever Heard" contains in the lyrics: "Now I saw Bob Dylan gone electric, feeling Pete Seeger with his axe in the crowd. Maggie and the farm, never meant no harm, but my heart started beating too loud."
 The !!! song "Shit Scheisse Merde, Pt. 1" contains the lyric: "I try my very best, to be just like I am, but everybody wants me to be like Zimmerman", a reference to "Maggie's Farm".
 On Peter Mulvey's 1995 release, Rapture, the title track contains the lyrics: "Guess we're all gonna work on Maggie's farm for a little while longer now, Not tell anyone what we have inside to give."
 In the 1980s, "Maggie's Farm" was widely adopted as an anthem by opponents to British Prime Minister Margaret Thatcher. The many instances of the song being referenced in anti-Thatcher art or literature include:
 Chris Rea's 1989 song "Looking For A Rainbow" features the lyrics: "Yeh we're Maggie's little children; And we're looking for Maggie's farm."
 the Mark Knopfler song "Wye Aye Man", from the album The Ragpicker's Dream, which contains the lyric "...nae more work on Maggie's Farm." The song is about redundant British laborers having to seek work in Germany as a result of Thatcher's economic program.
 the Billy Idol song "Fatal Charm" uses the term in a reference to his punk roots with Generation X.
 Cartoonist Steve Bell's comic strip "Maggie's Farm," which appeared in the London listings magazines Time Out from 1979 and later in City Limits.
 The Placebo song "Slave to the Wage" contains the lyrics: "Sick and tired of Maggie's farm".
 In the 1989 mystery novel A Necessary End by Peter Robinson an actual farm inhabited by suspects in the murder crime to be solved by Robinson's Inspector Banks is named "Maggie's Farm" and it is mentioned that this is based on Dylan's song.
 In the 1990 movie The Freshman, Bert Parks, portraying a version of himself and acting as event MC and musical host, performs a cover of "Maggie's Farm" during the final gathering of the Gourmet Club, a group of wealthy individuals who attend a covert and expensive dinner in order to dine on the last of an endangered species (which is actually an elaborate con, with the real meal consisting of more conventional ingredients).
 In the 2006 movie Lady In the Water, the rock band, Silvertide, that starts to play during the party at The Cove (as a setup for Story's departure), begins playing their own, harder-rock style version of Maggie's Farm.
 President Barack Obama said that "Maggie's Farm" was one of his favorite songs to listen to during the election season.
 Maggie's Farmhouse Ale is the name of Terrapin Beer Company's 7th Volume of their Side Project Series of beers.
 Maggie's Farm is the name of a popular dispensary near Colorado Springs, CO.
 The band Goodnight, Texas released I'm Going to Work On Maggie's Farm Forever in 2012. It tells the story of a worker on "Maggie's farm" who has given up hope of ever leaving.

Citations

General and cited references

External links 
 VSO Productions 1966 release of Maggie's Farm video.

1965 songs
Songs written by Bob Dylan
Bob Dylan songs
The Specials songs
Tin Machine songs
Grateful Dead songs
Song recordings produced by Tom Wilson (record producer)
Columbia Records singles
1965 singles
Rage Against the Machine songs
Songs against capitalism